is a Japanese ONA series about pole dancing animated by Tatsunoko Production and produced by Avex Pictures. It is directed by Hitomi Ezoe and written by Touko Machida, with Yoshihiro Otobe serving as CG director, and Shūji Katayama and Kenta Higashiohji composing the music at Avex Pictures. Original character designs are provided by Tomari. KAORI of STUDIO TRANSFORM is the pole dancing supervisor. A prologue was streamed on YouTube on December 23, 2022. The series began streaming on YouTube on January 13, 2023.

Characters

Aile D'ange

References

External links
 Anime official website 
 

2022 anime ONAs
2023 anime ONAs
Anime with original screenplays
Gymnastics in anime and manga
Tatsunoko Production
YouTube original programming